Kids in Glass Houses are a Welsh rock band from Cardiff. The band's name was inspired by the lyrics "not throwing stones at you anymore" from the Glassjaw song "Tip Your Bartender". The band achieved success on the strength of the singles "Give Me What I Want" and "Saturday" off their debut album Smart Casual in 2008.  The band released their second album Dirt in early 2010, releasing four singles, most notably "Matters at All". The band's third album, In Gold Blood, was released on 15 August 2011. Their fourth album, Peace, was released on 30 September 2013.

History

Beginnings (2003–2007)
The quintet had a series of support slots during late 2006 and early 2007, playing alongside Lostprophets, Thirty Seconds to Mars, Hundred Reasons, Manic Street Preachers and The Goo Goo Dolls and Fall Out Boy In the band's early stages, they also shared the stage with the likes of Funeral for a Friend and The Used on the Taste of Chaos 2005 UK tour in Cardiff.  They released their debut full-length EP E-Pocalypse! on 9 October 2006.

During their time as an unsigned band, the band garnered a rare and unprecedented amount of press and support from rock media, including Kerrang! and NME as well as BBC Radio 1 and XFM. In a television interview Lostprophets vocalist Ian Watkins claimed that "relatively unknown bands such as Kids in Glass Houses are a lot better than a lot of known bands out there."

In August 2007, the band were nominated for Best British Newcomer at the Kerrang! Awards, where the group were beaten to the award by Gallows. Despite Kids in Glass Houses' disappointment at not winning, fellow countrymen Lostprophets brought the band up on stage with them to claim their own award. During the run up to the awards, Kids in Glass Houses played a special show, titled The Day of Rock, inside Zavvi on Oxford Street, London, alongside Enter Shikari, Fightstar, The Answer and Turisas.

During October 2007, the band completed a 16 date headline tour of the UK supported by London's Tonight Is Goodbye (now Futures) and friends of the bands rotating on the tour – Saidmike (now Straight Lines) and The New 1920. Following that they supported fellow Welshmen Funeral for a Friend, on their December 2007 UK tour.

Smart Casual (2008)

They signed to Roadrunner Records on 8 December 2007, shortly before going on stage to support Funeral For A Friend. Between the October and December tours, the band recorded their debut album at Long Wave Studios with Romesh Dodangoda, who also produced the band's previous EP. During a studio session, the band recorded a live version of Glassjaw's "Ry Ry's Song".

The band released "Easy Tiger" as their first single on 10 March 2008. The video received considerable rotation on music channels, as well as entering the Kerrang! Top 10 Overdrive upon the first week of its release.

The band released their debut album, entitled Smart Casual, on 26 May 2008. The album features re-recordings of three songs from E-Pocalypse!. Prior to this, the single "Give Me What I Want" (a re-recording of the track "Me Me Me") was released on 19 May 2008.

On 21 May 2008, the band embarked on a headline tour to promote Smart Casual which finished with a performance at Astoria 2 on 5 June 2008. The support for the tour was provided by American punk rock band Valencia. This was followed by another headline tour during October, with support provided by This City and Save Your Breath, and a European tour with Zebrahead and Simple Plan. The band were one of the support acts for Paramore and New Found Glory on the 2008 RIOT Tour – during which guitarist Iain Mahanty joined New Found Glory onstage to perform their song, "Hit Or Miss". They also supported Fall Out Boy on their UK arena tour in March 2009.

In February 2009, website Punktastic.com released the video for "Dance All Night". The song was announced as a single but was not released.

Dirt (2010) 
Recording of the second album started on 1 August 2009, in Texas, USA.

The first single was released on 5 October titled "Young Blood (Let It Out)", being released as a digital download single. Their second single "Matters At All" was released on 31 January 2010 and reached a peak of number 65 on the UK Singles Chart and also giving the band their first number 1 single on the UK Rock Chart. The band toured in February and March providing support for Lostprophets.

Dirt was released on 29 March 2010. The digital special edition includes three bonus tracks: "Believer", "Reputation" and "When The World Comes Down".

On 2 May 2010, they embarked on their headline tour starting in Newcastle and finishing in Exeter on 14 May. On 23 May they played the In New Music We Trust stage at the Radio 1 Big Weekend in Bangor, North Wales. They were joined on stage by Frankie Sandford for "Undercover Lover" and Dev from Radio One for a cover version of "Jump". On 5 June 2010, the band were one of three supporting acts for Stereophonics at their gig at the Cardiff City Stadium.

They released the third single from album Dirt, "Undercover Lover", on 13 June, which featured Frankie Sandford on guest vocals from The Saturdays. The single proved successful when it reached number 62 on the UK Singles Chart, the highest placement of a Kids in Glass Houses' single besides "Give Me What I Want".

The band played June Reading & Leeds Festival 2010 on the NME/Radio 1 Stage. The band toured the UK in November 2010 with Boys like girls and You And What Army for the Dirt Tour Part II.

Kids in Glass Houses also supported Stereophonics at Belsonic, a music festival in Custom House Square, Belfast.

In Gold Blood (2011–2012) 

In Kerrang! Magazine, Aled Phillips was quoted as saying the band are going in a "radically different direction". He added "It'll be a concept record, a big, grown-up rock record. It's going to document a journey. I don't want to give too much away, but it's looking to be our most 'mature' album." Recording for the album began in March with producer Jason Perry. Frontman Aled Phillips also announced on his Twitter account that Kids in Glass Houses will be touring in September/October. Aled later announced that the album would be released in late summer.

On 23 May 2011 the band announced that the title of their third studio album would be 'In Gold Blood'. It was released on 15 August. The title track 'Gold Blood' was released as a free download on 23 May, for a number of 4 days. 
On 9 July Kids in Glass Houses performed at Sonisphere Festival in Knebworth on the saturn stage, they debuted two songs from 'In Gold Blood', with both the title track and new single 'Animals' played as part of the set. The band was also noted for playing in costume for the first time, theming around mad max and American revolutionary attire.

In March 2011 the band released a fourth single from the album on 15 March: Diamond Days. The release accompanied and promoted their support tour with You Me at Six. This tour ranged through March and April 2011. Iain Mahanty has stated that they had planned and have always wanted to do a tour with You Me at Six "We've talked about doing this for a few years, and for one reason or another, it never came to fruition. We're very excited, then, to finally be able to tour the UK with our good friends in You Me at Six".

Kids in Glass Houses performed as one of the headlining acts on the main stage at Bingley Music Live, on Friday 31 August 2012.

Peace and break-up (2013–14)
As of March 2013 Kids in Glass Houses were in a studio in Lincoln recording their fourth album, Peace. Recording of the album was completed towards the end of March. The first single, "Drive", was released on 21 July 2013. The album was released on 30 September 2013.

On 26 February 2014, the band announced their break-up and a farewell tour to commence 5 October playing all across the UK. The band released a statement on their Facebook page, thanking supporters and haters alike, before revealing the tour dates.

Kids in Glass Houses played their final show on 31 October 2014 in the Great Hall, Cardiff to a capacity crowd.

Drummer Phillip Jenkins has since become the Touring Drummer for Welsh/American Alternative Rock Band, No Devotion, after former drummer Luke Johnson departed.
Andrew "Shay" Sheehy has announced he will perform with A at Download Festival. Iain Mahanty has moved into film/TV scoring, announcing that he will compose the original soundtrack for upcoming independent British horror film Strangers Within.

Reunion (2022-)
On August 30th 2022 it was announced that the band would be reuniting to perform 2 sets at Slam Dunk Festival 2023 celebrating 15 years of 'Smart Casual'.

Members

 Aled Phillips – lead vocals  
 Joel Fisher – rhythm guitar
 Iain Mahanty – lead guitar
 Andrew "Shay" Sheehy – bass guitar
 Philip Jenkins – drums & percussion

Discography

Studio albums

Singles

Videos
 2008 – Easy Tiger
 2008 – Saturday
 2008 – Give Me What I Want
 2008 – Dance All Night
 2008 – FISTICUFFS
 2009 – Young Blood (Let It Out)
 2009 – Matters at All
 2010 – Undercover Lover 
 2010 – The Best Is Yet To Come
 2011  – Animals
 2011 –  Not in This World
 2011 – Diamond Days 
 2012 – Secret Santa
 2013 – Drive
 2013 – Peace

EPs
 The Things Bricks Say (When Your Back Is Turned) – 2004

Written by Lloyd Breeze and Earl Phillips
 Trust Issues With Magicians – 2005
 E-Pocalypse! – 2006

References

External links
 Official website

Musical groups established in 2003
Musical quintets
Roadrunner Records artists
Warner Music Group artists
British pop punk groups
Welsh rock music groups
British indie rock groups